Johnny Leota (born 21 January 1984) is a Samoan rugby union player who played for Sale Sharks in the Aviva Premiership. Leota was born in Palmerston North, New Zealand and made his international debut for Samoa in 2011; he has since won 20 caps. He previously played for Manawatu Turbos in the ITM Cup. Started in 2001, making the NZ Rugby League U17 tournament team and NZ secondary schools tournament team. From here he progress into the Hurricanes schools team which lead to him being put into the academy. Leota followed the rugby path with no success until 2004 where he made his debut for Manawatu Rugby before making his breakthrough season to the Highlanders super rugby squad after a stunning 2007 season. He was offered a contract with the West Tigers in NRL 2007 but chose to go with the Highlanders.

Club career
Leota debuted for Manawatu in 2004 and developed into a fixture for the province, playing his 50th match in 2009. As part of his move to the Highlanders in 2008, he signed with Otago, but was immediately loaned back to Manawatu.

Leota missed most of the 2010 ITM Cup through injury, making only two appearances for the Turbos. He returned to action with Manawatu for the 2011 season.

Leota was signed by the Highlanders for the 2008 Super 14 season, and established himself as a key member of the squad, starting 12 of the team's 13 games and scoring two tries in the process.

In 2009, Leota again made 12 appearances for the Highlanders, but was reduced to six starts and was used mainly as a substitute through the second half of the season.

Leota was not retained by the Highlanders for the 2010 Super 14 season, and instead found himself in the wider training group of the Hurricanes. However, he did not make an appearance for the squad and was not brought back after missing most of the 2010 provincial season through injury.

On 11 August 2011, Leota moved to England as he signed for Sale Sharks who compete in the Aviva Premiership after the conclusion of the 2011 Rugby World Cup.

Leota left Sale Sharks at the conclusion of the 2018-19 season

International career
Leota was one of 25 players selected in the squad for the Samoan national team's 2011 Pacific Nations Cup campaign, in the leadup to the 2011 Rugby World Cup. He made his international debut for Samoa against Tonga in Lautoka, Fiji. Shortly thereafter he returned to New Zealand and resumed provincial duties for Manawatu.

Personal life
Johnny Leota is married to Liana Leota (née Barrett-Chase), a netball player in the Silver Ferns and the Southern Steel. The couple married in 2010 in Rarotonga, and have one daughter, Brooklyn.

References

External links
Manawatu Turbos profile
Sale Sharks Profile

1984 births
New Zealand rugby union players
New Zealand sportspeople of Cook Island descent
New Zealand sportspeople of Samoan descent
Samoa international rugby union players
Highlanders (rugby union) players
Manawatu rugby union players
Sale Sharks players
New Zealand expatriate rugby union players
Expatriate rugby union players in England
New Zealand expatriate sportspeople in England
Samoan expatriate rugby union players
Samoan expatriate sportspeople in the United Kingdom
People educated at Palmerston North Boys' High School
Living people
Rugby union players from Palmerston North
Rugby union centres